Michael K. Williams (born October 4, 1994) is an American football wide receiver for the Los Angeles Chargers of the National Football League (NFL). He played college football at Clemson, and was drafted by the Chargers seventh overall in the 2017 NFL Draft.

Early years
Williams attended Lake Marion High School & Technology Center in Santee, South Carolina, where he played on the football team. He had 66 receptions for 1,296 yards and 11 touchdowns as a junior, and he had 60 receptions for 1,395 yards and 10 touchdowns as a senior. Williams was rated by Rivals.com as a four-star recruit. He committed to Clemson University to play college football.

College career

Williams played in all 13 games as a true freshman in 2013, making three starts. He finished with 20 receptions for 316 yards and three touchdowns. Williams returned as a starter his sophomore year in 2014. He finished the year with 57 receptions for 1,030 yards and six touchdowns.

In 2015, in the first game of the season against the Wofford Terriers, Williams fractured a bone in his neck after colliding with the goal post just as he was catching a touchdown pass from quarterback Deshaun Watson on his team's first offensive series of the game.   He sat out the rest of the season and received redshirt status.

In 2016 as a redshirt junior, Williams returned to his starting role and started all 15 games for Clemson, recording team highs in receptions (98), yards (1,361), and touchdowns (11).  He caught touchdown passes in 9 games (including 3 against rival South Carolina) and had over 100 yards receiving in 5 games.  In the National Championship Game against Alabama, Williams caught eight passes for 94 yards and one touchdown. Williams completed his bachelor's degree in sociology in December 2016.

On January 10, 2017, hours after Clemson defeated Alabama 35–31 for the national championship, Williams announced that he would forgo his senior year and enter the 2017 NFL Draft.

Statistics

Professional career
Coming out of Clemson, Williams was considered a top prospect and projected as a first round pick by the majority of draft experts and analysts. He attended the NFL Combine, but only performed the bench, vertical, and broad jump. He performed the 40-yard dash, 20-yard dash, and 10-yard dash at Clemson's Pro Day and also ran positional drills. Williams was ranked the best wide receiver in the draft by ESPN, the second best wide receiver by Pro Football Focus, the third best wide receiver by Sports Illustrated, and NFLDraftScout.com ranked him the third best wide receiver in the draft.

The Los Angeles Chargers selected Williams in the first round with the seventh overall pick in the 2017 NFL Draft. He was the second wide receiver selected (No. 5, Corey Davis) in the draft. 

On May 11, 2017, the Los Angeles Chargers signed Williams to a fully guaranteed four-year, $19.74 million contract with a signing bonus of $12.50 million.

2017 season
Williams participated in rookie minicamp, but missed organized team activities and was expected to miss the start of training camp due to a mild herniated disc in his lower back. On July 30, 2017, it was announced by head coach Anthony Lynn that Williams was expected to miss the entire training camp due to his back injury.

He was inactive for the first six games of the regular season and made his professional regular season debut in Week 6. He made his first career reception on a 15-yard pass by quarterback Philip Rivers in the fourth quarter of their 17–16 victory at the Oakland Raiders, before being tackled by safety Karl Joseph. On November 19, 2017, Williams caught a season-high five passes for 38-yard during a 54–24 victory against the Buffalo Bills in Week 11. Williams was sidelined for the Chargers' Week 13 win against the Cleveland Browns after sustaining a knee injury in the first quarter of their 28–6 victory at the Dallas Cowboys the previous week.

2018 season
In Week 2, Williams recorded his first professional touchdown in the 31–20 victory over the Buffalo Bills. The following week, against the Los Angeles Rams, he had four receptions for 81 receiving yards and two touchdowns. In Week 15 against the Kansas City Chiefs, Williams had his best game of the season as he caught 7 passes for 76 yards and two touchdowns, plus rushing for 19 yards for a touchdown. He also caught a late go-ahead two-point conversion with four seconds left in a 29–28 victory despite being down 14–28 with five minutes left. For his performance in Week 15, Williams was named AFC Offensive Player of the Week. He finished the 2018 season with 43 receptions for 664 receiving yards and ten receiving touchdowns.

2019 season
In Week 9 against the Green Bay Packers, Williams caught three passes for a season-high 111 yards in the 26–11 win.  This was Williams' first game with at least 100 receiving yards of the season.
In Week 13 against the Denver Broncos, Williams caught five passes for 117 yards in the 23–20 loss. Overall, in the 2019 season, Williams recorded 49 receptions for 1,001 receiving yards and two receiving touchdowns.

2020 season
On April 30, 2020, the Chargers exercised the fifth-year option on Williams' contract.
In Week 5 against the New Orleans Saints on Monday Night Football, Williams recorded five catches for 109 yards and two touchdowns during the 30–27 overtime loss.
In Week 16 against the Denver Broncos, Williams recorded his first career interception off a pass thrown by Drew Lock on a Hail-Mary attempt with no time left in the game to secure a 19–16 win for the Chargers.

2021 season
Williams had a breakout season in 2021, setting career highs in receptions (76), targets (129), and yards (1,146) while scoring nine touchdowns.  He showed rapport with ascending Chargers quarterback Justin Herbert, particularly to start the season, totaling six receiving touchdowns and 471 receiving yards in the Chargers' first five games.

On March 8, 2022, Williams signed a three-year, $60 million contract extension with the Chargers.

NFL career statistics

Regular season

Postseason

References

External links 

Los Angeles Chargers bio
Clemson Tigers bio

1994 births
Living people
African-American players of American football
People from Orangeburg County, South Carolina
Players of American football from South Carolina
American football wide receivers
Clemson Tigers football players
Los Angeles Chargers players
21st-century African-American sportspeople